Anoncia leucoritis is a moth in the family Cosmopterigidae. It was described by Edward Meyrick in 1927. It is found in North America, where it has been recorded from south-eastern Washington south to California and from there east to Arizona and Texas.

Adults have been recorded on wing in April and August.

The larvae feed on Mentzelia laevicaulis.

References

Natural History Museum Lepidoptera generic names catalog

Moths described in 1927
Cosmopteriginae
Moths of North America